Aquitanian could refer to:

Aquitanian (stage), a geological age, the first stage of the Miocene Epoch
Aquitanian language, an ancient language spoken in the region later known as Gascony
Aquitani (or Aquitanians), were a people living in what is now Nouvelle-Aquitaine and southwestern Midi-Pyrenees, France
 Anything originating from Aquitaine, a region of France

Language and nationality disambiguation pages